Admiral Train may refer to:

Charles J. Train (1845–1906), U.S. Navy rear admiral
Charles R. Train (admiral) (1879–1967), U.S. Navy rear admiral
Elizabeth L. Train (born 1955), U.S. Navy rear admiral
Harold C. Train (1887–1968), U.S. Navy rear admiral
Harry D. Train II (born 1927), U.S. Navy admiral